Upul Chandika Hathurusingha  (born 13 September 1968) is a former cricketer. He was also the former head coach of the Sri Lanka national cricket team. Hathurusingha also worked as the head coach of the Bangladesh national cricket team between 2014 to 2017 and 2023 to be continued.

He has also coached the United Arab Emirates, the Sri Lanka A cricket team, New South Wales and Sydney Thunder. A right-handed all-rounder who bowled medium-fast, Hathurusingha played 26 Tests and 35 One Day Internationals for the Sri Lankan national side, and also had a successful domestic career for Tamil Union Cricket and Athletic Club and Moors Sports Club.

Playing career
An opening batsman, Hathurusingha most often opened alongside Roshan Mahanama. A useful pace-bowler, Hathurusingha was not called into the Test side until an injury to Mahanama stopped him from playing. Hathurusingha started his career by piecing together a trio of half-centuries in his first three matches. After a long layoff from the side when other players took over in the opening batsman position, and the subsequent discovery of Sanath Jayasuriya in just that position, Hathurusingha began to play once again, but this time as a strong middle-order batsman and medium-pace bowler. This was not to prove overly effective, though, and when Hathurusingha was not called upon to play in the Cricket World Cup in 1999, this brought about an end to his international career. He played once again in the Premier Tournament and became Player of the Tournament three seasons running (2001–02, 2002–03, 2003–04). His Twenty-20 career began in 2005–06. He has not played international cricket since 1999.

Coaching career
Having retired from first-class cricket at the end of the 2004–05 season, and Twenty20 cricket at the end of the following season, Hathurusingha was appointed coach of the United Arab Emirates in December 2005 on a one-year contract. Following the completion of this contract, he was named coach of Sri Lanka A on a three-year contract with Sri Lanka Cricket. In 2009, he was named senior assistant to Sri Lanka's national coach, Trevor Bayliss, but he was fired in June 2010 due to disciplinary reasons, after returning early from a tour of Zimbabwe to attend a coaching course in Australia. Despite a request from Kumar Sangakkara, the national team's captain at the time, for him to be retained in the position, Hathurusingha was not reappointed, and subsequently obtained permanent residency in Australia. He was a coaching consultant for the Canada national cricket team at the 2011 World Cup,

Hathurusingha was appointed assistant coach of New South Wales in September 2011, on a two-year contract. When senior coach Anthony Stuart was dismissed from the position in December 2012, midway through the 2012–13 season, Hathurusingha was named acting coach for the remainder of the season. Trevor Bayliss was appointed coach of New South Wales for the 2013–14 season, with Hathurusingha remaining as senior assistant and also taking over from Shane Duff as coach of the Sydney Thunder in the Big Bash League, as part of a restructure of Cricket NSW's coaching system.

Bangladesh
In May 2014, Hathurusingha was named as coach of the Bangladesh national side, replacing Shane Jurgensen, who had resigned following the 2014 ICC World Twenty20. Up to 2017, he is the most successful coach to ever get involved in Bangladesh cricket, with ODI series victories against India, Pakistan and South Africa, and Test victories against Sri Lanka (away), England and Australia. During his tenure, Bangladesh moved higher in Team Rankings and qualified for the 2017 ICC Champions Trophy and directly qualified for 2019 ICC Cricket World Cup as well. He has rejoined as the Head Coach of Bangladesh Cricket Team in February, 2023 for two more years.

Sri Lanka
On 9 November 2017, Hathurusingha resigned from coaching the Bangladesh team. On 8 December Sri Lanka Cricket announced that he would be the head coach of the national team after their 2018 tour in India.

Updated: 28 June 2019

Bangladesh
He was reappointed as head coach of the squad of Bangladesh on 31st January 2023.

References

External links

1968 births
Living people
Alumni of Ananda College
Coaches of the Bangladesh national cricket team
Cricketers at the 1992 Cricket World Cup
Cricketers at the 1998 Commonwealth Games
Moors Sports Club cricketers
Sri Lankan cricket coaches
Sri Lankan cricketers
Sri Lanka One Day International cricketers
Sri Lanka Test cricketers
Sri Lankan emigrants to Australia
Tamil Union Cricket and Athletic Club cricketers
Coaches of the United Arab Emirates national cricket team
Big Bash League coaches
Commonwealth Games competitors for Sri Lanka